The Comunidade Intermunicipal da Região de Leiria (English: Leiria Region) is an administrative division in western Portugal. It was created in 2014, replacing the former Associação de Municípios da Região de Leiria created in 2009. Since January 2015, Região de Leiria is also a NUTS3 subregion of Centro Region, that covers the same area as the intermunicipal community. The seat of the intermunicipal community is Leiria. Região de Leiria comprises a large part of the former district of Leiria. The population in 2011 was 294,632, in an area of 2,449.12 km².

Municipalities

The intermunicipal community of Região de Leiria consists of 10 municipalities:

References

External links
Official website CIM Região de Leiria

Intermunicipal communities of Portugal
Centro Region, Portugal